Selku Mardi was an Indian politician belonging to the Indian National Congress. He was elected to the Lok Sabha, lower house of the Parliament of India from West Dinajpur, West Bengal.

References

External links 
Official biographical sketch in Parliament of India website 

1915 births
India MPs 1957–1962
Indian National Congress politicians
Lok Sabha members from West Bengal
Year of death missing